T3P may refer to:

Glyceraldehyde 3-phosphate
Propanephosphonic acid anhydride